The 1994 Atlantic Coast Conference men's basketball tournament took place in Charlotte, North Carolina, at the second Charlotte Coliseum. North Carolina won the tournament, defeating Virginia, 73–66, in the championship game. Jerry Stackhouse of North Carolina was named tournament MVP.

Bracket

AP rankings at time of tournament

References

External links
 

Tournament
ACC men's basketball tournament
College sports in North Carolina
Basketball competitions in Charlotte, North Carolina
ACC men's basketball tournament
ACC men's basketball tournament